Gößnitzkopf is a mountain in the Schober Group of the Hohe Tauern range. It is located in Austria, along the border of East Tyrol and Carinthia.

The nearest municipalities are Nußdorf-Debant, Tyrol to the west and Heiligenblut, Carinthia to the east.

Mountains of Tyrol (state)
Mountains of Carinthia (state)
Schober Group
Geography of East Tyrol
Mountains of the Alps